Disney Channel is a Latin American pay television network broadcasting throughout Hispanic America and Brazil. It was officially launched on July 27, 2000 as a premium-label channel in Hispanic America, and also in Brazil back on April 5, 2001, and became a basic pay TV network in 2004.

It is available using four different feeds, each with various programming schedules and timings. It is mostly marketed to children; however, in recent years the range of viewers has expanded to include an older audience. Disney Channel is operated by Disney Media Networks Latin America and owned by The Walt Disney Company Latin America, both of which are originally from The Walt Disney Company.

History
In July 2000, while Disney Channel in the United States changed its "premium television" label to "basic" subscription TV network, the channel was launched in Latin America using the same graphical branding as Disney Channel in Europe, created by GÉDÉON, but with most of the same programming as the US version (some differences were abound). In the beginning, the network's broadcast was divided in two feeds": North feed, aimed towards Mexico, Central America and the Caribbean, and South feed, aimed towards South America (excluding Brazil), each with different programming schedules. Disney Channel also launched its first original production, Zapping Zone, with hosts bringing news and introducing the Disney Channel Original Series to the audience.

On April 5, 2001, a Brazilian feed was also launched, replacing Disney Weekend, a weekend-only broadcast channel; it began at around 8:00pm, coinciding the premiere of The Lion King, as it now broadcasts every single day.

In 2004, Anne Sweeney, a veteran cable executive, took control of Disney–ABC Television Group and changed the design from the channels worldwide. On that same year, Disney Channel became a "basic" cable channel and used the 2002 look of Disney Channel U.S. Along with the new look, the channel started to air new series, mainly focused on teenagers and placing the original animated cartoons in earlier schedules. In the morning schedule, Playhouse Disney was aired with programming for children aged 2–7.

In 2005, the network became one of the most viewed channels in the region, premiering Disney Channel Original Series such as That's So Raven and Phil of the Future.

A fourth feed, known as the Central feed, was created and was broadcast on Colombia, Venezuela, Central America and the Caribbean, broadcasting from Colombia and using the Colombian time zone.

In 2006, very successful series and films such as Hannah Montana, The Cheetah Girls, High School Musical and Jump In! premiered.

In July 2007, the channel rebranded its graphical package to a more "hip" look, using the "Ribbon" branding of the US Disney Channel.

On June 1, 2008, The Walt Disney Company Latin America launched Playhouse Disney (currently Disney Junior, a preschool-oriented channel focused solely on programming for young children aged 2 to 7. A few months later, Playhouse Disney was also launch in Brazil, exclusively for TVA & Telefónica TV Digital subscribers.

The Disney Junior-branded block in the morning was still broadcast in the same schedule until 2012. In 2008, Disney Mobile was re-branded as Disney Mobile Studios, which created content for cellphones.

On November 1, 2009, Disney Channel launched its fifth feed, the Pacific feed, aimed at Chile, Peru, Ecuador and Bolivia and employed the Chilean time zone. In that same date, the network renewed schedules, idents and promos in all of its feeds. On August 20, 2010, a new logo was introduced. On December 2, 2012, Disney Channel Latin America launched its own HD channel, simulcasting the Central feed.
	
On July 28, 2014, Disney Channel rebranded its graphical package with the new look unveiled in Germany on January 17, 2014, and in the US on May 23, 2014.

In 2016, Disney Channel HD turns into an independent channel with its own schedules, with promos now using three time zones (Mexico, Colombia and Argentina times). However, in 2019, all feeds launch their HD simulcasts, with the original HD channel turning into a high-definition simulcast of the Central feed again.

On May 1, 2021, the South +1 signal ceases its transmissions at 6:00 am, and is replaced by the original South signal in Chile, Bolivia, Peru and Ecuador without delay. Argentina continues to be the head of the South signal and the programming continues to be broadcast based on its time zone, but the times shown on the screen correspond to those of Argentina and Chile.

On April 1, 2022 Its sister channel Disney XD was shut down in the region; as well as Disney Junior in Brazil, all in favor for the streaming service Disney+.

Feeds
Disney Channel has three different feeds for each region, which are called North, Center and South; these are broadcast in high definition natively simultaneously with the standard resolution signal.
Until July 2014, the North, Center and HD feeds received the locution of the Mexican voice actors Noé Velásquez and Pedro de la Llata (until 2014), with a neutral accent, while the South feed received the narration of the Argentine Leandro Dugatkin with a River Plate accent. After the rebrand package that occurred on July 28, 2014, all the feeds receive the locution of Noé Velázquez and Lion Ollivier. After the premiere of new graphics on October 30, 2020, all the feeds receive the locution of Emilio Treviño..

Notes 

 In January 2010, a new channel signal was launched based in Santiago and aimed at Chile, Peru, Ecuador and Bolivia. It was divided into 2 sub-signals, with the same programming: One for Chile and Bolivia, with Chilean hours and commercials; and another for Peru and Ecuador, with local commercials and with one or two hours of delay in programming, depending on the time change in Chile in summer and winter. The deferred sub-signal for Peru and Ecuador was discontinued in March 2017 to make way for a new autonomous signal specifically for those two countries, called the Peru signal. On June 5 of the same year, the Pacific signal is suppressed to serve as a mirror channel to the South Atlantic Signal with a difference of one hour (Signal +1), based in Buenos Aires, while the Peru signal ceases to broadcast autonomously. and retransmits the same content as the South Atlantic signal (currently, South Signal) with a difference of two hours (signal +2). Both services broadcast advertising according to the countries of coverage. In April 2019, Signal +2 is eliminated and is replaced by Signal +1 in Peru and Ecuador.
 In Peru, Movistar TV used to offer the Pacific signal without delay in the satellite service, while in the digital and analog cable service it had the signal deferred for two hours (Pacific Signal +2). From March to June 2017, the cable channel becomes Peru Signal. As of June of that same year, due to the changes made by Disney, Movistar began to offer the South Signal +2 by cable, while the South Signal +1 continued to be available in the satellite service. Since April 2019, after the elimination of the South Signal +2, the cable service replaced it with the Signal +1.
 In Chile, Peru and Ecuador you could see the original Sur signal through DirecTV and TuVes HD, since May 2021 these countries geographically receive the Sur signal.
 In Colombia, Movistar TV used to broadcast the Pacific signal until February 2017, when it was replaced by the North Atlantic Signal (currently Central Signal) due to the division of the Pacific signal in two.
 In Venezuela, Movistar TV distributes the South Signal +1. From March to June 2017, it continued to distribute the Chile signal despite the division of the Pacific signal.
 In Argentina, Disney Channel issued Advertising Space identifiers, as a result of the legal provisions established by Law 26,522 on Audiovisual Communication Services and Modifications. This practice was reversed in 2016.
 In Mexico, Disney Channel displays age rating identifiers at the beginning of each program or movie available under media laws in the country.
 From its launch in December 2012 until its closure in August 2018, Disney Channel HD was broadcast simultaneously throughout Latin America in high definition, but does not make a simultaneous connection with local signals. It had independent programming. On August 14, 2018, the channel was replaced by the HD versions of the local signals depending on the country. In itself, its programming began to broadcast the Disney Channel's Central signal.
 In Argentina, Movistar TV distributed the North Signal from 2018 to 2020, when it was replaced by the channel's South signal.
 In Honduras, the operator Mayavisión distributes Disney Channel's North signal and not the channel's Central Signal.
 In Central America and the Dominican Republic, the Sky satellite operator broadcasts the North Signal instead of the Center signal.
 In Colombia and Paraguay, Claro TV offered the South Signal +1 in its satellite service, since May 1, 2021 it offers the original South signal after the elimination of the South Signal +1.
 In Panama, Tigo in its satellite version broadcasts the South +1 signal instead of the Center Signal. From May 1, 2021, it broadcasts the original South signal after the elimination of the South +1 signal.
 On May 1, 2021, after 11 years, the South +1 signal is discontinued and is replaced by the original South signal without delay in Chile, Bolivia, Peru and Ecuador.

Programming

Series produced by Disney Television Animation and Disney Channel Original Series takes most of the schedule. Some non-original series are also aired, such as Patito Feo, Casi Ángeles, Mortified, The Fairly OddParents, Chiquititas, A Kind of Magic, The Secret Show, The Next Step, Floricienta, George of the Jungle, Miraculous: Tales of Ladybug and Cat Noir (except Brazil where its aired on Gloob), Find Me in Paris and Trollhunters: Tales of Arcadia. There are also locally produced original series, such as As the Bell Rings, Soy Luna, Violetta, Once and Bia

Programming blocks

Sabatón/Sabatona 
Sabatón (Portuguese: Sabatona) is a programming block based from Disney XD, broadcast every Saturday. A different marathon of some animation series aired 3 hours each week. It began back in April 2, 2022, coinciding the shut down of Disney XD in the region.

Cartoon Block 
The space between the ending of Disney Junior is mainly used as a cartoon block with animated Disney Channel original series and series from Disney Television Animation. The series that are aired and their schedules are varied depending on the zone.

Movies 

Wonderful World of Disney was the block after the Zapping Zone where different Walt Disney Pictures were aired. The block aired on weekdays. The early-afternoon weekday film block is named Cool After School. On weekends it is replaced with a Disney Cinemagic block. Movies were occasionally aired on Disney Junior.

It was followed by another film block, but this one airs Disney Channel Original Movies. It aired on Thursdays, Fridays, and Saturdays after Zapping Zone and sometimes any other weekday after The Wonderful World of Disney. Some of the films premiered on Rede Telecine or HBO Family before they premiered here. The highest-rated film in this block was High School Musical 2, with 3.3 million viewers.

As of 1 October 2020, all films from Walt Disney Studios Motion Pictures library were removed permanently from the Disney Channels programming due the launch of Disney+ in Latin America on 17 November 2020.

Holidays 
Due to the season differences in Latin America, the timing of the summer special varies by region. It starts in late June and ends in early September in the North and Central feeds. In the South and Pacific feeds it begins in December and ends in late February. It includes premieres of new films and television series episodes. For Halloween and Christmas the channel airs themed films and episodes.

The channel does not air the New Year events of Disney Channel of the United States. Its New year Event is an original production of the channel, named Celebratón. Viewers vote on the website for their favorite movies, episodes, and specials. The most voted ones are aired December 31. It is hosted by the cast of Zapping Zone. There is a countdown and previews of new programs coming in the next year. It replaced the previous block "Popcorn".

Sister channels

Disney Junior (closed)
 

It is a pay television channel broadcasting in all Latin America using four feeds. It is directly marketed to preschoolers. It was launched on 1 June 2008 as Playhouse Disney Channel. Formerly it was only a programming block that aired on Disney Channel during mornings. Its programming is very similar to the US channel; however, it also airs non-original programming. On December 23, 2010 The Walt Disney Company Latin America announced that the channel would be rebranded as Disney Junior sometime in 2011, and the relaunched eventually happened on April 1, 2011. It was closed in Brazil on March 31, 2022, while this channel continues to operate in the Hispanic America countries.

Disney XD (closed)

It was a pay television channel broadcasting throughout Latin America and the Caribbean. It was launched on November 8, 1996, as Fox Kids, rebranded on August 1, 2004, as Jetix, and took on its current branding on July 3, 2009. It is broadcast using four feeds. It features male-focused series along with action, comedy and animated series. It is marketed to boys from 6 to 14. It is operated by Disney Media Networks and The Walt Disney Company Latin America, which are owned by The Walt Disney Company. The channel was closed on April 1, 2022.

Defunct

Zapping Zone
Disney Channel Latin America produced an original series titled Zapping Zone, on which different hosts interact with the viewers with games and trivia. It was aired only on weekdays from July 27, 2000, to October 26, 2012. They also give news about Disney Channel, the channel's series, upcoming Disney films and new Disney Channel Original Movies. It is transmission is not live, and viewers can call to participate in different games, all of them containing questions and trivia about Disney films and series. Just for participating, they can win T-shirts and caps, and if they win, the awards include DVDs, soundtracks and video games of other Disney films and characters.

The hosts of the Zapping Zone presented the series, Disney Channel Original Series that are aired in the block as a primetime. New episodes of animated and live-action series were often aired every weekday. New music videos or trailers also premiered in the block, introduced by the hosts. There were also blocks such as Stop, Bloopers, and Xtreme Friday.

Logos

See also
 Disney Channel
 Disney Branded Television
 Disney XD (Latin American TV Channel) (closed)
 Disney Junior (Latin American TV Channel)
 The Walt Disney Company Latin America

References

External links
 Official Website
 Disney Channel Argentina
 Disney Channel Mexico
 Disney Channel Brazil

Latin America
Children's television networks
Television channels and stations established in 2000
Spanish-language television stations
2000 establishments in South America
The Walt Disney Company Latin America